Parliamentary elections were held in Hungary on 17 May 1953. As would be the case with all elections for the remainder of Communist rule, voters were presented with a single list from the Communist Hungarian Working People's Party, comprising Communists and pro-Communist independents.  The Working People's Party  won 206 of the 298 seats, with the remaining 92 going to independents.

Results

References

Elections in Hungary
Parliamentary
Hungary
One-party elections

hu:Országgyűlési választások a Magyar Népköztársaságban#1953